The Hajji Bendo Mosque or Haji Bedo Mosque is an Ottoman-era mosque built before the 17th century inside the Borsh Castle of Himara, Albania. It is on the Sopot hill.

The dome, which used to be of red tiles, is now covered with concrete. The Muslim frescoes and nakkaşlık works inside are endangered. Half the stone minaret is still missing until today.

The Hajji Bendo Mosque was built before the 17th century and named after the vassal of Ali Pasha of Janina, Haxhi Bendo. After being destroyed during Communism, the mosque did not got rebuilt for the local Albanian population under the reign of post-Communist regime, while most of the Byzantine-Greek churches and monasteries of the region get rebuilt.

The building is one of the works of Ottoman architecture in Albania. Today it is an important tourist spot in Borshi village.
The Hajji Bendo is located in the Lukovë administrative unit of Himara Municipality of Vlorë County. It is one of the Ottoman mosques that was damaged and closed during the dictatorship of Enver Hoxha. During the reign of the People's Socialist Republic of Albania, many of the Ottoman mosques were destroyed and replaced by Socialist and Modernist architecture.

External links 

 Aleksandër Meksi: Xhamitë e Shqipërisë. Plejad, Tirana 2018, Xhamia në Kalanë e Borshit – Sarandë, p. 81–84.

Ali Pasha of Ioannina
Mosques in Vlorë County
17th-century mosques
Buildings and structures in Himara
Tourist attractions in Vlorë County
Mosques destroyed by communists